Eugenia Krassowska-Jodłowska (1910-1986) was a Soviet-Polish Politician (Communist).

She was a member of the Polish Council of State, making her a member of the Collective Head of State, in 1965-1972.

References

1910 births
1986 deaths
20th-century Polish women politicians
20th-century Polish politicians
Polish communists